For Newton number, see also Kissing number in the sphere packing problem.

The power number Np (also known as Newton number) is a commonly used dimensionless number relating the resistance force to the inertia force. 

The power-number has different specifications according to the field of application. E.g., for stirrers the power number is defined as:

with 
P: power
ρ: fluid density
n: rotational speed in revolutions per second 
D: diameter of stirrer

References 

Dimensionless numbers of fluid mechanics
Fluid dynamics